Rebecca Jane Rolls (born 22 August 1975) is a New Zealand former cricketer and association footballer who represented New Zealand in both sports. In cricket, she played as a wicket-keeper and right-handed batter, and appeared in 1 Test match, 104 One Day Internationals and 2 Twenty20 Internationals for New Zealand between 1997 and 2007. She played domestic cricket for Central Districts and Auckland. In football, she made 21 appearances for New Zealand.

Cricket
Rolls had a long One Day International career, representing New Zealand in 104 matches, as well as 1 Test match. She was only the second New Zealand woman to reach the 100 ODI milestone, after Debbie Hockley. She was a wicketkeeper batsman. She played in the victorious Women's Cricket World Cup at Lincoln in 2000 and she also played for the Auckland Hearts in the State League. She was born in Napier.

Rebecca Rolls is also the first female cricketer to have completed the double of scoring 2000 runs and effecting 100 dismissals as wicketkeeper in WODI history

Women's One Day International centuries

Football
Rolls has played internationally for New Zealand as a goalkeeper. She made her Football Ferns debut in a 0–1 loss to Bulgaria on 24 August 1994 and ended her international career with 11 caps to her credit.

Sixteen years later Rolls made a shock comeback for the national team, being called into the 2012 Cyprus Cup squad. In July 2012 she was named in the New Zealand party for the London Olympics. She also played in the final of the 2013 Valais Cup competition for New Zealand against the People's Republic of China. She was part of New Zealand's squad at the 2015 FIFA Women's World Cup in Canada.

Personal life
Of Māori descent, Rolls affiliates to the Ngāti Porou iwi. Following her playing career, Rolls has worked for the police, the Serious Fraud Office and the Department of Corrections.

References

External links
 
 Profile at NZF
 

1975 births
Living people
New Zealand women cricketers
Central Districts Hinds cricketers
Auckland Hearts cricketers
Sportspeople from Napier, New Zealand
New Zealand women's association footballers
New Zealand women's international footballers
Women's association football goalkeepers
Footballers at the 2012 Summer Olympics
Olympic association footballers of New Zealand
New Zealand women Test cricketers
New Zealand women One Day International cricketers
New Zealand women Twenty20 International cricketers
2015 FIFA Women's World Cup players
Footballers at the 2016 Summer Olympics
Ngāti Porou people
Cricketers from Napier, New Zealand
Wicket-keepers